Following is a list of karst springs in Bosnia and Herzegovina. Most of the country's karstic wellsprings belong to Dinaric Alps systems of limestone, flysch, and/or their tectonic contact zone. These are almost regularly large founts in hydrogeological terms, with large average annual discharges, and with extremely high amplitudes between minimum and maximum discharge, depending on seasonal flow, precipitation, other various hydrological parameters and sometimes anthropological impacts. Waters often emerging from large karst caves, in many cases with complex underground flow, various characteristic karstic features and endemic biodiversity, creating short river courses with relatively large water discharge.

See also

List of caves in Bosnia and Herzegovina

References 

s